Elisabetta Gucci Hotel is a boutique hotel expected to open in Dubai by the end of 2010. The hotel will have 87 rooms.

The property in Dubai is being developed by the Abu Dhabi-based Baitek International Real Estate Investment. Room rates would probably start from about Dh1,500 (US$408), with the presidential suite going for about Dh25,000 a night.

References

Further reading
 

Hotels in Dubai